The Point Edward Pacers are Junior "B" box lacrosse team from Point Edward, Ontario, Canada.  The Pacers play in the OLA Junior B Lacrosse League.  The Pacers are four-time Founders Cup Canadian Junior B champions.

History

The Point Edward Pacers were founded in 1973 as members of the OLA's Junior C League.  After three seasons, including the last two making the division final, the Pacers were promoted to the Ontario Junior B Lacrosse League.

Despite starting off with a losing season and not making the playoffs, the Pacers went 19–1 in 1977 and lost in the league final.  The next two years, the Pacers won both the OJBLL playoffs and the Founders Cup as Canadian Junior B champions.  The Pacers repeated this in the 1983 and 1984 season.

In 1989, the Pacers, now based out of Sarnia, Ontario, were promoted to the Ontario Junior A Lacrosse League.  The Pacers stayed in Junior A until 1998, but struggled.  The Pacers never made it past the league semi-final and in the 1998 season went winless with a 0–22 record.

The Pacers returned to the OJBLL in 1999, putting up winning seasons in five of their first six years back in the league.  From 2005 until 2013, the Pacers fell off and did not make the playoffs.  In 2013, the Pacers returned to Point Edward.

Season-by-season results
Note: GP = Games played, W = Wins, L = Losses, T = Ties, Pts = Points, GF = Goals for, GA = Goals against

Playoff results

External links
Pacers Webpage
The Bible of Lacrosse
Unofficial OLA Page

Ontario Lacrosse Association teams
Sport in Sarnia